Sufi rock or Sufi folk rock is a subgenre of rock music that combines rock with classical Islamic Sufi music traditions. It emerged in the early 1990s and became widely popular in the late 1990s in Pakistan and Turkey. The term "Sufi rock" was coined in 1993 by writer Nadeem F. Paracha to define the Pakistani band Junoon, who pioneered the process of fusing conventional rock music with folk Sufi music and imagery.

History 
It is mostly based on the poetry of famous sufi poets such as Rumi, Hafez, Shah Abdul Latif Bhittai, Bulleh Shah, Waris Shah and even Kabir and is mostly sung in languages such as Urdu, Pashto, Punjabi, Sindhi, Persian and Turkish.

See also

Pakistani rock
Culture of India
Music of Pakistan
Music of India
Pakistani hip hop
Culture of Pakistan
Taqwacore

References

External links
The New Sufiana – Indian Express

Fusion music genres
Pakistani styles of music
Indian styles of music
Rock music genres
Sufi music
Sufism in Pakistan
Sufism in India
Pakistani rock music